SiM (Silence iz Mine) are a Japanese alternative metal band from the Kanagawa Prefecture formed in 2004. The band currently consists of MAH (vocals), SHOW-HATE (guitar), SiN (bass), and GODRi (drums). Their musical style mixes heavy metal, alternative, hip hop, ska, reggae, dub and punk with rebellious lyrics and songs with attitude.

The band signed with Pony Canyon in 2022 and released their single "The Rumbling", used as the opening theme for the anime Attack on Titan: The Final Season Part 2. The single managed to enter US Billboard charts. It charted at  1 on the Hot Hard Rock Songs,  5 on the Bubbling Under Hot 100 Singles,  2 on the Hard Rock Digital Song Sales, and  13 on the Hot Rock & Alternative Songs.

History

2004–2006: Formation and earlier days
SiM was founded by MAH in November 2004 in Shonan, Kanagawa Prefecture, Japan. The band consisted of MAH on vocals and guitar, KAH on bass guitar, and WAY on drums. At the beginning of the formation, they called the three piece band "Silence iz Mine" (the current band's name is an abbreviation of it).

In 2006, SHOW-HATE joined and picked up guitar; KAH left the band, then BUN joined on bass until 2008.

2007–2009: New formation and Silence iz Mine
In 2008, the band released their first full album entitled Silence iz Mine. In the same year, they performed for the first time in Kyoto.

In 2009, WAY left SiM, while SiN and GODRi joined the band. SiN played bass, and GODRi took WAY's place on drums.

2010–2012: Seeds of Hope
In 2010, the band released their single "Anthem" under Tower Records label and did their tour. During the tour, SHOW-HATE collapsed with cerebral infarction that caused the sudden tour cancellation. While waiting for recovery, ONO-SHiT followed as a support member on guitar. On October 6, 2010, the band's first mini album LIVING IN PAiN was released.

In 2011, their second full album Seeds of Hope was released.

On May 2, 2012, the band released their second mini album LiFE and DEATH. In this year, they performed for the first time at Summer Sonic Festival 2012.

2013–2015: Pandora
In 2013, they joined Monster Energy Outburn Tour 2013 with Coldrain. The band moved to Universal Music Japan and made a major debut with single "Evils" on April 3, 2013. On October 23, they released the first album Pandora since their major debut, and peaked at fifth in the Oricon weekly chart.

In 2014, the band held a one-man performance at Shinkiba Studio Coast. Their third mini album i Against i was released.

On October 6, 2014, their single "Existence" was used as the opening theme for the anime Shingeki no Bahamut: Genesis, and peaked at  20 on Billboard Japan Hot 100 while "Crows" reached No. 18 on Billboard Japan Hot 100 and stayed for 2 weeks.

On November 4, 2015, SiM performed at Nippon Budokan which was their THE TOUR 2015 FiNAL -ONE MAN SHOW at BUDOKAN. Tickets were sold out.

2016–2018: The Beautiful People
On April 6, 2016, the band's fourth album The Beautiful People was released. On May 6, 2016, they appeared on Fuji TV series HEY! HEY! NEO! with "MAKE ME DEAD!". On May 11, 2016, SiM released the live DVD WHO SAYS WE CAN NOT of their performance at "The Tour 2015 FiNAL -One Man Show at Budokan, ranking fourth on the Oricon weekly DVD chart and fifth on the Blu-ray chart.

On September 25, SiM performed for the first time in the USA as a part of Ozzfest meets Knotfest. On October 16, the final performance of the tour "SiM THE BEAUTiFUL PEOPLE Tour 2016 Grand FiNAL Dead Man Walking" was held at the Yokohama Arena.

On February 22, 2017, SiM performed as the opening act on "2017 One Ok Rock Ambitions Japan Tour" at Wakayama Big Whale. On April 7, 2017, the song "Let It End" was used as the opening theme for the anime Shingeki no Bahamut: Virgin Soul. On December 6, 2017, SiM released their seventh single "A / The Sound Of Breath", which was used as in the soundtrack for the video game Yakuza Kiwami 2.

On November 20, 2018, the band released the single "Diamond". On December 12, 2018, the band released the single "Lion's Dens", which was used as the opening song for Japan's Wrestle Kingdom 13.

2019–present: Thank God, There Are Hundreds Of Ways To Kill Enemies 
On November 3, 2019, the band released the single "SAND CASTLE" with AKKOGORILLA.

On January 30, 2020, the band announced their new album Thank God, There Are Hundreds Of Ways To Kill Enemies would be released on April 15, 2020. On February 11, 2020, the band released the single "BULLY". On March 17, the band released the single "Devil in Your Heart". On March 31, the single "BASEBALL BAT" was released. In April 2020, the band announced that the album's release date had been postponed to June 17, 2020. On May 11, the band released the single "CAPTAiN HOOK".

In January 2022, SiM's song "The Rumbling" was featured as the opening theme for the anime Attack on Titan: The Final Season Part 2. The single was officially released on February 7, 2022, coming just after the band was moved to the Pony Canyon record label. SiM performed in the US at Crunchyroll Expo on August 6 and their sold-out headlining show on August 9, 2022. On September 21, the band released their new EP Beware, containing four tracks including "The Rumbling".

In March 2023, SiM's single "Under the Tree" was used as the ending theme song for the part 3 of the anime Attack on Titan: The Final Season. It was also announced by Pony Canyon that a new studio album by the band will be released in the summer. SiM is confirmed to perform at Download Festival in the UK on June 8–11, followed by a headline show "The Rumbling in LDN", in London, on June 13.

Band members
Current members
 MAH (Manabu Taniguti) – vocals , guitars 
 SHOW-HATE (Shouhei Iida) – guitars, keyboards, backing vocals 
 SiN (Shinya Shinohara) – bass guitar, backing vocals 
 GODRi (Yuya Taniguchi) – drums, backing vocals 

Former members
 KAH – bass guitar 
 BUN – bass guitar 
 WAY – drums 

Timeline

Discography

Studio albums

Mini albums

Extended plays

Singles

DVDs

Covers

Collaborations

Songs appearances

Music videos

Tours

Japanese tours
 Punkspring with Various Artists (2009)
 Summer Sonic Festival with Various Artists (2012)
 Punkspring with Various Artists (2013)
 Rising Sun Rock Festival with Various Artists (2013)
 Skindred  "Kill The Power" Japan Tour with SiM and Air Swell (2014)
 Punkspring with Various Artists (2014)
 Fuji Rock Festival with Various Artists (2014)
 Knotfest Japan with Various Artists (2014)
 Ozzfest Japan with Various Artists (2015)
 Knotfest Japan with Various Artists (2016)

World tours
 Knotfest in USA with Various Artists (2016)
 SiM "Rumble in Los Angeles"  (2022)
 Download Festival in UK with Various Artists (2023)
 SiM "The Rumbling in LDN" (2023)

Awards and nominations

See also
 Japanese rock

References

External links
 Official website 

Japanese alternative metal musical groups
Japanese alternative rock groups
Japanese punk rock groups
Japanese metalcore musical groups
Japanese nu metal musical groups
Reggae metal musical groups
Reggae rock groups
Post-hardcore groups
English-language musical groups from Japan
Musical groups established in 2004
Crunchyroll Anime Awards winners